Evil Spirits is the eleventh studio album from the Damned. Released on 13 April 2018, it was their first album in ten years and was produced by famed producer Tony Visconti who is best known for his work with David Bowie. The album was largely crowdfunded by a successful PledgeMusic campaign.

Background
Captain Sensible said of the album: "we deliberately recorded the album retro style, the same way our debut album was made, basically. There's something wonderful about the seventies sounds; glam, rock and punk records, they all sound so great and Tony specializes in beautifully crafted old school production. He had us all playing live, bashing it out in the same room with a focus on getting the initial band version of each song as close as possible to the finished thing."

Reception
The album received some of the best reviews in years for the Damned. Zachary Hoskins of Slant Magazine said, "The Damned sounds like the same band they were 35 years ago. While it's admittedly hard not to miss the explosive presence of drummer Rat Scabies, Sensible's lashing power chords on "The Devil in Disguise" are a welcome reminder that this is still technically a punk band, and David Vanian's baritone has aged into a powerful growl reminiscent of latter-day Nick Cave. While Evil Spirits isn't a late-career masterpiece, Visconti's production chops have at least ensured a warm and rich listening experience." Ian Rushbury of PopMatters said, "Evil Spirits is a strong, weirdly timeless album. It's hard to pin this record down to a point in time – it certainly doesn't sound like 2018, but it sure as eggs are eggs doesn't sound like it's from 1978 either. It sounds like a band stretching out and having fun in a studio, under the watchful eye of someone who is accustomed to working with mavericks and outcasts."  Evil Spirits became the band's first album to make the top 10 on the United Kingdom's Official Charts, peaking at number seven.

Track listing

Personnel 
Credits adapted from the album's liner notes, except where noted.

The Damned
Dave Vanian – vocals
Captain Sensible – guitar
Monty Oxymoron – keyboards
Paul Gray – bass
Pinch – drums
Additional musicians
Chris Coull – trumpet
Kristeen Young – backing vocals
Tony Visconti - backing vocals
Technical
Tony Visconti – producer, mixing
Kevin Killen – engineer
Erin Tonkon – assistant engineer
Joe LaPorta – mastering engineer 
Jez Larder – pre-production (Skyline Studios, Ashford, Surrey)
Jon Priestley – pre-production (Abatis Studios, Honiley, Warwickshire)
Mitchell Thomas – front cover design
Laurence Thomas – front cover design
Alex Tillbrook – additional artwork
Shigeo Jones Kikuchi – photography 
Kurt Steinmetz – photography  
Steven Gullick – photography  
John Nikolai – photography

Charts

References 

The Damned (band) albums
2018 albums
Albums produced by Tony Visconti
Search and Destroy Records albums
Spinefarm Records albums